William Wallace Grout (May 24, 1836October 7, 1902) was an American politician and lawyer. He served as a U.S. Representative from Vermont.

Biography
Grout was born in Compton in Lower Canada (now Quebec), the son of Josiah and Sophronia (Ayer) Grout. His parents, native Vermonters, returned to that state when he was thirteen. Grout pursued an academic course, he attended St. Johnsbury Academy and graduated from the State and National Law School in Poughkeepsie, New York, in 1857. He was admitted to the bar in December of the same year and began the practice of law in Barton, Vermont.

In 1862 Grout was nominated as State's Attorney of Orleans County but declined, deciding instead to enter the army. In July 1862 he received his commission as lieutenant colonel of the 15th Vermont Volunteer Infantry Regiment in the Union Army during the Civil War. He later attained the rank of brigadier general as commander of one of three brigades organized for border defense by the Vermont State Legislature following the St. Albans Raid.

Grout served as State's Attorney of Orleans County in 1865 and 1866. In 1868 he was a delegate to Republican National Convention from Vermont. He served in the Vermont House of Representatives from 1868 until 1870 and in 1874. In 1876 he was a member of the Vermont State Senate and served as President pro tempore.

Grout was elected as a Republican Congressman to the Forty-seventh Congress from Vermont's 3rd congressional district, serving from March 4, 1881, until March 3, 1883. The 3rd District was eliminated at the end of his term. He was an unsuccessful candidate for Vermont's 2nd congressional district in 1882 to the Forty-eighth Congress.

Grout was elected to the Forty-ninth from the 2nd Vermont District and to the seven succeeding Congresses, serving from March 4, 1885, until March 3, 1901. He served as chairman of the Committee on the District of Columbia in the Fifty-first Congress, and was on the Committee on Expenditures in the Department of War in the Fifty-fourth through the Fifty-sixth Congresses.

From 1881 until 1888, Grout's law practice included Willard W. Miles as his partner; when Grout withdrew in 1888 so that he could concentrate his full time efforts on his Congressional career, Miles continued the practice alone.

After leaving Congress, he engaged in agricultural pursuits and the practice of law. Grout died on October 7, 1902, and is interred in Grove Cemetery in Saint Johnsbury, Vermont.

Personal life
Grout was the second child of ten, eldest of five sons. Seven of the children were born in the Compton house. There were no finished chambers in the Compton house. In winter, awakening to snow on the bed was a common experience.

The family moved to Kirby, Vermont, from Compton.

Grout married Loraine M. Smith in 1860, and they had two children who died while in infancy. Loraine died in 1868.

Grout's brother Josiah Grout, was the Speaker of the Vermont House of Representatives and was the 46th Governor of Vermont.

His nephew Aaron H. Grout, the son of Josiah Grout, served as Vermont Secretary of State from 1923 to 1927.

References

Further reading
 Gazetteer of Caledonia and Essex Counties, Vt. 1764–1887, published by Syracuse Journal Company, Printers and Binders, 1887.

External links

 Biographical Directory of the United States Congress: Grout, William Wallace, (1836 - 1902)
 
 The Political Graveyard: Grout, William Wallace (1836–1902)
 Govtrack.us: Rep. William Grout
 Vermont in the Civil War: William W. Grout
 Our Campaigns: Grout, William W.

1836 births
1902 deaths
State and National Law School alumni
Vermont lawyers
2nd Vermont Brigade
Union Army officers
People of Vermont in the American Civil War
People from Barton, Vermont
Republican Party members of the Vermont House of Representatives
Republican Party Vermont state senators
Presidents pro tempore of the Vermont Senate
Republican Party members of the United States House of Representatives from Vermont
19th-century American politicians
State's attorneys in Vermont